William Henry Lamport (May 27, 1811 – July 21, 1891) was a U.S. representative from New York.

Born in Brunswick, New York, Lamport moved with his parents to Gorham, New York, in 1826. He attended the public schools. He engaged in agricultural pursuits. He was Supervisor of Gorham in 1848 and 1849 and Sheriff of Ontario County, 1850–1853. He was a member of the New York State Assembly (Ontario Co., 1st D.) in 1855.

He moved to Canandaigua, New York in 1864 and was president of the village of Canandaigua in 1866 and 1867.

Lamport was elected as a Republican to the 42nd and 43rd Congresses (March 4, 1871 – March 3, 1875). He was not a candidate for renomination in 1874.

He retired to Canandaigua where he died on July 21, 1891, and was interred in the West Avenue Cemetery.

References

1811 births
1891 deaths
People from Brunswick, New York
Politicians from Canandaigua, New York
People from Gorham, New York
Republican Party members of the United States House of Representatives from New York (state)
19th-century American politicians